Royer Labs is an American microphone company that some consider to be one of the foremost manufacturers of ribbon microphones. The reasons most often cited for this opinion is that Royer has combined the traditional warmth of vintage ribbon microphones with modern output levels. While older ribbon microphones had a great sound, the ribbons were weak and would break easily. Royer microphones, however, are still strong enough to be placed in front of electric guitar amps, a placement that certain older ribbons could not have weathered. 

David Royer designed his first ribbon microphone in 1997 and started the company that bears his name one year later. When that first microphone, the R-121, was released, it received positive reviews from all the major recording magazines.

The R-121 Ribbon microphone contained two innovations that delivered the performance levels necessary for professional studio use. Neodymium (rare-earth) magnets produce a much stronger magnetic field than the AlNiCo magnets used by vintage designs, raising the microphone's sensitivity. High-grade output transformers raise the microphone's signal-to-noise ratio. 

The R-121 is also known for its use of Royer's patented "offset ribbon" design, in which the placement of the aluminum ribbon allows it to withstand louder sources from the front of the microphone, as well as giving the microphone a slightly different voicing from front to back.

The company has continued to innovate, and was the first to develop a phantom powered ribbon microphone, and a tube-ribbon microphone.

In Use

Royer microphones have been used on many instruments. Sound engineers have had good results when recording classical guitars, drum kits, pianos, woodwinds, and electric guitars. Users of Royer microphones include Carlos Santana, Herb Alpert, Steve Albini, Ross Hogarth, and Ed Cherney.

External links
http://emusician.com/tutorials/emusic_ribbon_mic_summit/index2.html, Gino Robair, "Ribbon Mic Summit," Electronic Musician, August 2006
http://mixonline.com/mag/audio_royer_labs_ribbonvelocity/index.html, Barry Rudolph, "Royer Labs R-121: RIBBON-VELOCITY STUDIO MICROPHONE," Mix, April 1999
http://www.soundonsound.com/sos/apr00/articles/royerr121.htm, Sound on Sound, "Funky Ribbon," April 2000
http://recordinghacks.com/2012/06/11/david-royer-interview/, Interview with David Royer, June 2012
http://www.royerlabs.com/quotes.html

Microphone manufacturers
Audio equipment manufacturers of the United States
American brands